Lurch may refer to:

Entertainment
Lurch (The Addams Family), fictional butler in the 1960s American television series
Lurch McDuck, fictional character, Scrooge McDuck's cousin, in the 1968 Disney story
Lurch (EP), released in 1990 by Steel Pole Bath Tub

Games 
Lurch (cards), in card games like Cribbage when a player or team loses with a particularly low score
a synonym for Lourche, a lost 17th century French board game, surviving only in the phrase "left in the lurch"

Nickname
Björn Andersson (handballer) (born 1950), Swedish former handball player
Gene Brabender (1941-1996), American Major League Baseball pitcher
Barry Goodingham (born 1945), former Australian rules footballer
Robert Jackson, musician with the band New Birth
John O'Neill (rugby league) (1943-1999), Australian rugby league player

Other uses
Jerk (physics), also known as lurch, the rate of change of acceleration
Lurch, an Ankole-Watusi steer holding world record for horn circumference

See also
Big Lurch (cosmology), a cosmological model for the ultimate fate of the universe
Big Lurch (born 1976), rapper and convicted murderer and cannibal

Lists of people by nickname